Yulon Motor Co., Ltd. is a Taiwanese automaker and importer. Taiwan's biggest automaker as of 2010, Yulon is known for building Nissan models under license. The original romanization of the company's name is Yue Loong, but in 1992 the company renewed its logo and switched to the shorter Yulon name. Historically, it is one of Taiwan's "big four" automakers. The company has over time evolved as a holding company that encompassed multiple public entities such as Yulon-Nissan Motor, Yulon Financial, Yulon Rental, Carnival Industrial Corporation and others. The group currently has a rivalry with Hotai Motor Group as the two largest Taiwanese automotive companies.

Yulon created a new brand to sell self-designed cars, Luxgen, in 2010.

As of 2017 it had a Revenue of NT$99 billion (US$3.4 billion) and about 12,680 employees.

History
Incorporated in September 1953 as a machinery company by Ching-Ling Yen, today Yulon Motor Co., Ltd. is part of the Yulon Group, a Taiwanese conglomerate.

The company is associated with the creation of a Taiwanese auto industry aided by its government. This pattern is being again realized by Malaysia's Proton. During 1953–1960 an era of "passive protection" reigned and Yulon grew with the assistance of protectionary tariffs of 40–60%. Parts and components received substantially lower tariffs to help fledgling carmakers.

Early on, Yulon looked for foreign partners, but it wasn't until 1956 that an American company, Willys, agreed to share technology. The next year Yulon began its long-lasting partnership with Nissan.

While the first Yulon model was a 1956 jeep, with engine production beginning in September of that year, passenger car assembly only started in 1960 with the Bluebird after an agreement with Nissan was signed in 1957. While primarily building Nissan models and other cars under license, Yulon has designed and produced at least one original family car, the 1986 Feeling 101. (Yulon began producing wholly original products again starting in 2009 with the debut of its Luxgen brand.) Until the introduction of the Nissan branded Cefiro A32 (in February 1996), the various license-built Nissans had all been branded Yue Loong (Yulon after 1992).

Assembler
With production bases located in China, Philippines and Taiwan, Yulon makes license-built versions of many automakers' models. The companies it manufactures in cooperation with include Chrysler, Geely, GM, Mercedes Benz, Mitsubishi and Nissan. It assembles most of the vehicles from complete knock down kits.

The company has used its design and engineering expertise to localize its manufactures to suit Taiwanese tastes.

While Yulon continues to manufacture vehicles for sale on the Taiwanese market, as of 2010 it also imports Nissan, Infiniti, and Renault models for sale in the domestic Taiwanese market.

Nissan
Yulon has maintained a strong cooperative relationship with Nissan since 1957. After the 1985 passing of a Taiwanese act, the Automobile Industry Development Act (AIDA), Yulon accepted Nissan taking a 25% stake. Nissan maintained their ownership in Yulon until at least 2003 when a restructuring created Yulon-Nissan Motor Co Ltd, a separate company that focuses on complementing Nissan's mainland China activities with research, design, and manufacturing assistance.

Brands 
Yulon has marketed cars under two in-house brands: Luxgen (released in 2009) and Tobe (released in 2010, ended 2013).

Luxgen

The first Taiwanese auto brand, Luxgen, was created by Yulon in 2008. On 18 August 2009, Yulon revealed the first car for its new Luxgen brand. Luxgen cars are developed under Yulon's R&D center HAITEC, using engines and transmissions provided by other companies. As of 2010, Luxgen products are sold in Taiwan and Oman.

Tobe

Yulon's second brand, Tobe, was established in 2009. From 2010 to 2013, Tobe sells its only model, a re-badged, re-designed Geely Panda/LC called the Tobe M’Car, in Taiwan and Vietnam. Plans to enter other emerging markets exist. However, poor sales and the brand image of being a rebadged Geely led to the end of the brand in 2013.

Production bases
Yulon has a number of production bases in several countries, including China, Pakistan, Philippines until 2013, Taiwan and probably Thailand.

China
Initial production base investment in China for Yulon was buying 5% ownership in a Southern China production base in the 1990s. 2000 saw another, larger Chinese production base investment this time of 25%. The latter acquisition was probably in Fengsheng Motors, a Dongfeng Motors subsidiary.

As of 2003, Yulon had 25% ownership in the subsidiary yielding access to production bases in Huadu District, Guangzhou, Guangdong and Xiangfan, Hubei.

Philippines
In 1999 Yulon bought a 75% ownership of Nissan's newly built production base in Santa Rosa, Laguna state. This occurred after the Nissan Motor Company pulled out of the Philippines after the Asian market crises caused poor sales in the country. In 2013, it was announced that Nissan Motor Company of Japan will be again taking over Nissan in the Philippines. This comes after dismal sales and poor model updates from Yulon Taiwan, which ranked Nissan Philippines well below local rivals from Toyota, Mitsubishi, and Hyundai—not reflective of its ranking as no. 6 global carmaker.

Joint ventures  
All of Yulon's joint ventures in Mainland China are with Dongfeng Motor.

Dongfeng Yulon

A joint venture with Chinese automaker Dongfeng, called Dongfeng Yulon (or Dongfeng Luxgen), was set up in 2009 and will manufacture Yulon's Luxgen models in China after the completion of a planned production base in Hangzhou in 2011. The cars will be sold in China. In July 8 of 2019 Luxgen signed MoU with Mongolian company AGT Auto to build its first car assembly factory in Mongolia. Dongfeng Yulon entered bankruptcy in 2020.

Fengshen Automobile
In 2003, Yulon had part ownership in a subsidiary of Dongfeng Motor, Fengshen Automobile Co Ltd.

See also
 List of companies of Taiwan
 List of Taiwanese automakers
 List of Nissan vehicles Yulon Motors has built under license
 List of motor scooter manufacturers and brands

References

External links 

 Yulon Motor – English official site

1953 establishments in Taiwan
Car manufacturers of Taiwan
Vehicle manufacturing companies established in 1953